Ryan Downe is an American musician and audio engineer.  His debut album The Hypocrite was released in 1996 by Elton John's label, The Rocket Record Company. Two music videos were produced to promote this album: "Where Am I Gonna Run To" and "Scratch". Downe opened for both The Who and Iggy Pop during their 1997 tours.  Later he and his guitarist Johannes Luley opened Freudenhaus Recording Studio in San Francisco. It was during this time that Downe is credited with co-engineering and playing/singing on the Grammy Award-nominated album, Arepa  3000, by Los Amigos Invisibles. Downe then joined up with Luley, keyboardist Tom Lynham and drummer / co-lead-singer Matt Swindells to create the band Moth Vellum with whom he released one album.

Discography

Solo album
 The Hypocrite (1996)

Track listing:

with Moth Vellum
 Moth Vellum (2007)

References

Year of birth missing (living people)
Living people
American rock musicians
American audio engineers
Rocket Records artists